Fort Black (also known as Fort Squirrel Hill and Fort Chess) was a fort built in the Greenfield neighborhood (then part of Squirrel Hill) of Pittsburgh, Pennsylvania in 1863, during the Civil War.

It was located on Bigelow Street (formerly Squirrel Hill Road) between Parade and Shields streets, and had cannons facing the Point, and trenches to protect soldiers.

The fort was one of the most massive of the 27 built at the time to defend Pittsburgh from the Confederates, and like the other forts, was built of mounds of dirt.

A powder magazine was also built nearby, on Beechwood Boulevard.

It remained standing until its demolition in 1928.

References

Black
1863 establishments in Pennsylvania
Pennsylvania in the American Civil War
Pittsburgh metropolitan area
Military installations established in 1863
1928 disestablishments in Pennsylvania
Buildings and structures demolished in 1928
Demolished buildings and structures in Pittsburgh